The Oklahoma drill is an American football practice technique used to test players in confined full contact situations. The technique was developed by Oklahoma Sooners coach Bud Wilkinson.

Description
The drill has several variations. The most common involves two players lined up three yards opposite one another. A corridor is set up typically using three blocking bags on each side of the players lined up top to bottom to create a wall, and the walls are spaced about one yard apart. This creates an area of about three feet by nine feet. The two players, at the sound of the whistle, then run at one another and the drill is over when one of the players is on the ground, or if a ball carrier is involved when he is tackled, or if the ball carrier runs out of bounds. If a player is able to drive the other player out of the corridor, that also ends the drill. In a variation, the ball carrier must keep running until they score a touchdown.

Prevalence
Many high school and college teams use the Oklahoma drill as a way to kick off the first day of full contact practice. While often criticized as excessive, some argue that it can be a critical tool used by coaches to evaluate players that might have looked good in non-contact drills, but have yet to face full contact. Other times the drill is used simply to get players in the proper mind-set for full contact practices, especially in high school and college, where many times players have gone up to eight months doing only non-contact drills.  

The Oklahoma drill, along with other full-contact drills, was officially banned from NFL team practices in May 2019 following years of declining use and increasing concerns for player safety. Veterans and high-profile NFL players rarely participate in pit drills owing to the higher risk of injury. Prior to the ban many team owners and coaches already refused to permit the drill. Notable exceptions had included the Chargers, and the Bengals who used the drill as a kind of celebration of the first day of full-contact practices. On October 7, 2015, Dan Campbell reportedly used the Oklahoma drill to begin his first practice as interim head coach of the Miami Dolphins. On July 29, 2018, the Detroit Lions used a reportedly safer variant of the Oklahoma drill during practice under first year head coach Matt Patricia.

References

American football terminology
Oklahoma Sooners football